Palencia Cathedral (Catedral de Palencia) is a Roman Catholic church located in Palencia, Spain. It is dedicated to Saint Antoninus of Pamiers (San Antolín).

The cathedral was built from 1172 to 1504 stands over a low-vaulted Visigothic crypt (the Crypt of San Antolín). In front of the Proto-Romanesque temple is the old Visigothic chapel from the mid-7th century, built during the reign of Wamba to preserve the remains of the martyr Saint Antoninus of Pamiers, a Visigothic-Gallic nobleman brought from Narbonne to Visigothic Hispania in 672 or 673 by Wamba himself. These are the only remains of the Visigothic cathedral of Palencia.

It is a large Gothic building, popularly dubbed as "the unknown beauty" because it is not as well known as other Spanish cathedrals, though it is a valuable building which has in its interior works of art of great value, including El Greco's painting The Martyrdom of Saint Sebastian (1576–1579) and a retablo of twelve panels by Juan de Flandes, court painter to Queen Isabella I of Castile.

Its more than 130 metres long, 42 metres high and 50 metres wide at the centre. Just by way of comparison, the internal length of the Cathedral of Reims, reaches 138m, in turn, the height of the central nave, reaches 33m in Notre Dame de Paris; Reims 38m, 42m in Notre-Dame d'Amiens and 48m in Saint-Pierre de Beauvais. Its solid, simple and austere exterior does not reflect the grandeur of its interior, with more than twenty chapels of great artistic and historical interest. The most recognizable feature on the outside is the tower, of 55 meters of height, solid and a little rough in its Gothic style. Recent studies and excavations show that it was a military tower, and after serving this function, pinnacles and cattail were added as the sole decoration.

Gallery

See also
Diocese of Palencia

References

Bibliography 
 Catálogo monumental de Castilla y León. Bienes inmuebles declarados. Vol I. Junta de Castilla y León, 1995. 
 Martínez González, Rafael A. Catedrales de Castilla y León. Catedral de Palencia. Editorial Edilesa, 2002. 
 
 Sancho Campo, Ángel. La Catedral de Palencia: un lecho de catedrales. León: Edilesa, 1996. 
 Sancho Campo, Ángel. La Catedral de Palencia: guía breve. León: Edilesa, 2005. 
 Martínez González, Rafael A., "La catedral de Palencia. Historia y arquitectura", Palencia, 1988,    
CALLE CALLE, Francisco Vicente: Las gárgolas de la Catedral de San Antolín de Palencia, www.bubok.com, 2008.

Roman Catholic cathedrals in Castile and León
Churches in Castile and León
Palencia
Burial sites of the Castilian House of Burgundy
Roman Catholic churches completed in 1504
16th-century Roman Catholic church buildings in Spain